A two-dimensional elastic membrane under tension can support transverse vibrations.  The properties of an idealized drumhead can be modeled by the vibrations of a circular membrane of uniform thickness, attached to a rigid frame.   Due to the phenomenon of resonance, at certain vibration frequencies, its resonant frequencies, the membrane can store vibrational energy, the surface moving in a characteristic pattern of standing waves.  This is called a normal mode. A membrane has an infinite number of these normal modes, starting with a lowest frequency one called the fundamental mode.

There exist infinitely many ways in which a membrane can vibrate, each depending on the shape of the membrane at some initial time, and the transverse velocity of each point on the membrane at that time.  The vibrations of the membrane are given by the solutions of the two-dimensional wave equation with Dirichlet boundary conditions which represent the constraint of the frame.  It can be shown that any arbitrarily complex vibration of the membrane can be decomposed into a possibly infinite series of the membrane's normal modes.  This is analogous to the decomposition of a time signal into a Fourier series.

The study of vibrations on drums led mathematicians to pose a famous mathematical problem on whether the shape of a drum can be heard, with an answer being given in 1992 in the two-dimensional setting.

Motivation

Analyzing the vibrating drum head problem explains percussion instruments such as drums and timpani. However, there is also a biological application in the working of the eardrum. From an educational point of view the modes of a two-dimensional object are a convenient way to visually demonstrate the meaning of modes, nodes, antinodes and even quantum numbers. These concepts are important to the understanding of the structure of the atom.

The problem

Consider an open disk  of radius  centered at the origin, which will represent the  "still" drum head shape. Let  denote the boundary of  that is, the circle of radius  centered at the origin, which represents the rigid frame to which the drum head is attached.

The mathematical equation that governs the vibration of the drum head is the wave equation with zero boundary conditions,

 

 

 

Here,  is a positive constant, which gives the speed at which transverse vibration waves propagate in the membrane.  In terms of the physical parameters, the wave speed, c, is given by

 

If the membrane has uniform tension, the uniform tension force at a given radius,  may be written

 

where  is the membrane resultant in the azimuthal direction.

The axisymmetric case
We will first study the possible modes of vibration of a circular drum head that are axisymmetric. Then, the function  does not depend on the angle  and the wave equation simplifies to

We will look for solutions in separated variables,  Substituting this in the equation above and dividing both sides by   yields

 

 
 

Physically it is expected that a solution to the problem of a vibrating drum head will be oscillatory in time, and this leaves only the third case,  so we choose  for convenience. Then,  is a linear combination of sine and cosine functions,

 

We will also assume  as otherwise this constant can be absorbed later into the constants  and  coming from  It follows that

 

The requirement that height  be zero on the boundary of the drum head results in the condition

 

The Bessel function  has an infinite number of positive roots,

 

We get that  for  so

 

Therefore, the axisymmetric solutions  of the vibrating drum head problem that can be represented in separated variables are

 

where

The general case

The general case, when  can also depend on the angle  is treated similarly. We assume a solution in separated variables,

 

Substituting this into the wave equation and separating the variables, gives

 

where  is a constant.

 

From the equation

 

 

and

 

for some constant  Since  is periodic, with period   being an angular variable, it follows that

 

This also implies 

Going back to the equation for  its solution is a linear combination of Bessel functions  and  With a similar argument as in the previous section, we arrive at

   

where  with  the -th positive root of 

We showed that all solutions in separated variables of the vibrating drum head problem are of the form

 

for

Animations of several vibration modes

A number of modes are shown below together with their quantum numbers. The analogous wave functions of the hydrogen atom are also indicated as well as the associated angular frequencies . This is deduced from the boundary condition  which yields .

More values of  can easily be computed using the following Python code with the scipy library:
from scipy import special as sc
m = 0 # order of the Bessel function (i.e. angular mode for the circular membrane)
nz = 3 # desired number of roots
alpha_mn = sc.jn_zeros(m, nz) # outputs nz zeros of Jm

See also
 Vibrating string, the one-dimensional case
 Chladni patterns, an early description of a related phenomenon, in particular with musical instruments; see also cymatics
 Hearing the shape of a drum, characterising the modes with respect to the shape of the membrane
 Atomic orbital, a related quantum-mechanical and three-dimensional problem

References

 

Partial differential equations
Mechanical vibrations
Drumming